Nihal Ahmed Maulavi Mohammed Usman, also known as Nihal Sahab or Sathi Nihal Ahmed or Nihalbhai, was an Indian socialist leader and politician belonging to Janata Dal (Secular). He was a former Minister of government of Maharashtra and legislator of the Maharashtra Legislative Assembly from 1960 until 1999. He was also the first mayor of the Malegaon Municipal Corporation. He died on 29 February 2016 at a private hospital in Nashik at the age of 90 following age-related ailments. He had been admitted to the hospital the night before due to respiratory problems. He was laid to rest at the Bada Kabrasthan burial ground later that night. He was survived by his wife, four sons and three daughters.

In 2002, Nihal received controversy due to organising a procession at Malegaon in 2001 to protest against the US attack on Afghanistan. Nonetheless, he was elected the first Mayor of Malegaon.

References

2016 deaths
Year of birth missing
Marathi politicians
Janata Dal (Secular) politicians
Janata Dal politicians
Leaders of the Opposition in the Maharashtra Legislative Assembly
People from Malegaon
State cabinet ministers of Maharashtra
Members of the Maharashtra Legislative Assembly